Events in the year 1915 in Spain.

Incumbents
Monarch: Alfonso XIII
President of the Government: Eduardo Dato (until 9 December), Álvaro Figueroa Torres (starting 9 December)

Births
 March 19 – José García Hernández (died 2000)
 July 25 – Julio Iglesias, Sr. (died 2005)
 August 8 – José Manuel Rodriguez Delgado. (died 2011)

References

 
Years of the 20th century in Spain
1910s in Spain
Spain
Spain